MTR CSR Sifang EMU may refer to either of the either of MTR's rolling stock:

 MTR CSR Sifang EMU (XRL), a MTR high-speed train to run on the Guangzhou–Shenzhen–Hong Kong Express Rail Link.
 MTR CSR Sifang EMU (Local), a future MTR rolling stock to run on Kwun Tong line, Tsuen Wan line, Island line and Tseung Kwan O line from 2018.